The Texas Department of Assistive and Rehabilitative Services (DARS)  was a Texas state agency that was part of the Texas Health and Human Services Commission.  The agency worked with Texans with disabilities and children with developmental delays to improve the quality of their lives and to enable their full participation in society.

The agency was headquartered at 4800 North Lamar Boulevard in Austin.

Former Sub-agencies:
Division for Rehabilitation Services (DRS) provides programs to help people with disabilities prepare for, find, and maintain employment. 
Office for Deaf and Hard of Hearing Services (DHHS) works in partnership with people who are deaf or hard-of-hearing to eliminate societal and communication barriers. 
Division for Blind Services (DBS) assists blind or visually impaired individuals and their families. 
Early Childhood Intervention (ECI) Services, a statewide program for families with children ages three or younger with disabilities and developmental delays.
Division for Disability Determination Services (DDS), funded entirely through the Social Security Administration (SSA), makes disability determinations for Texans with severe disabilities who apply for Social Security Disability Insurance and/or Supplemental Security Income.

As of September 1, 2016, DARS was dissolved by an act of the sunset commission. The Sunset Commission periodically reviews the performance of State/public agencies and institutions,  recommending revisions—and terminations.
 
The Texas Workforce Commission assumed the following programs
Vocational Rehabilitation Services
Blind & Visually Impaired Services
Criss Cole Rehabilitation Center
Independent Living Services for Older
Individuals Who Are Blind
Business Services - Vocational Rehabilitation
Providers’ Resources - Vocational Rehabilitation
Business Enterprises of Texas
Rehabilitation Council of Texas
Service Animal Information

And the Health and Human Services Department retained the following Programs
Autism Program
Blind Children's Vocational Discovery & Development Program
Blindness Education, Screening & Treatment Program
Comprehensive Rehabilitation Services
Deaf & Hard of Hearing Services
Disability Determination
Early Childhood Intervention Program
Independent Living Services

References

Department of Assistive and Rehabilitative Services  Web site

External links

DARS Homepage

Assistive and Rehabilitative Services, Texas Department of